Carlisle Township may refer to the following townships in the United States:

 Carlisle Township, Otter Tail County, Minnesota
 Carlisle Township, Lorain County, Ohio